John Taintor Foote (March 29, 1881 – January 28, 1950) was an American novelist, playwright, short-story writer, and screenwriter.

Foote studied at Kenyon Military Academy, Gambier, Ohio. He began as a writer of sporting stories. His first story was published in The American Magazine in 1913. He wrote horse stories featuring the roguish track character Blister Jones, and the story upon which the Alfred Hitchcock film Notorious is loosely based. He also wrote or collaborated on five plays, among them the comedy Toby's Bow (1919) and the dramas Tight Britches (1934), and Julie the Great (1936).

Foote came to Hollywood in 1938 to work on the screenplay of his book The Look of Eagles, which was retitled Kentucky, starred Loretta Young, and won an Academy Award for Walter Brennan. Foote's subsequent scripts included The Mark of Zorro, Broadway Serenade, Swanee River, The Story of Seabiscuit and The Great Dan Patch.

Foote is buried at Hollywood Forever Cemetery in Los Angeles.

References

External links
 
 
 

Blister Jones - free ebook at manybooks.net

1881 births
1950 deaths
American male screenwriters
People from Leadville, Colorado
Burials at Hollywood Forever Cemetery
American male dramatists and playwrights
20th-century American dramatists and playwrights
20th-century American male writers
Screenwriters from Colorado
20th-century American screenwriters